Victoria Steele is a former Democratic member of the Arizona State Senate representing District 9 from 2019 to 2023.  She is a twice elected former Democratic member of the Arizona House of Representatives, serving District 9 in Tucson from 2013 to 2016. She is a board member of the National Organization for Women (NOW). In 2019, she began the podcast Wait, What? Politics with Zuma and Steele, co-hosting with journalist Jimmy Zuma. She was elected as a Justice of the Peace in 2022.

Prior to entering politics, she had a career in radio and television news. She also created the Native Ways program at The Haven, a substance-use residential treatment program for Indigenous women. As a politician, she was on the board of the National Caucus of the Native American State Legislators.

In July 2015, she announced that she would run in the 2nd congressional district of Arizona for the 2016 United States House of Representatives, hoping to challenge incumbent Martha McSally. She resigned from the Arizona legislature in January 2016 to focus on her congressional race. Steele was endorsed in the Democratic primary by U.S. Representative Raúl Grijalva.

She is the State Legislative Coordinator for NOW and co-founder of the Tucson NOW Chapter.

Steele is of German and Seneca-Cayuga/Mingo heritage, enrolled with the Seneca-Cayuga Nation of Oklahoma.

References

External links
 Arizona legislature website
 Campaign website
 

Living people
Democratic Party members of the Arizona House of Representatives
American people of German descent
Seneca–Cayuga Nation
Native American state legislators in Arizona
Native American women in politics
Politicians from Tucson, Arizona
Women state legislators in Arizona
Year of birth missing (living people)
Place of birth missing (living people)
University of Phoenix alumni
Democratic Party Arizona state senators
21st-century American politicians
21st-century American women politicians
21st-century Native American women
21st-century Native Americans